Lee Jung-eun (born 9 April 1988) is a South Korean judoka. She won a Bronze medal in the +78 kg at the 2013 World Judo Championships.

External links
 

Living people
1988 births
Asian Games medalists in judo
Judoka at the 2014 Asian Games
South Korean female judoka
Korea National Sport University alumni
Asian Games silver medalists for South Korea
Universiade medalists in judo
Medalists at the 2014 Asian Games
Universiade silver medalists for South Korea
Medalists at the 2013 Summer Universiade
21st-century South Korean women